Édouard Nanny (March 24, 1872 in Saint-Germain-en-Laye – October 12, 1942 in Paris) was an important French double bass player, teacher, and composer. He was a longtime professor of double bass at the Paris Conservatory.

Career
Nanny was part of la Société de concerts des Instruments anciens. He gained some international exposure as a composer during his lifetime, although he never enjoyed the respect he received in France worldwide. Among his most famous works are his Concerto in E minor and his Enseignement Complet (a collection of pedagogical works including the 2-part Méthode complète pour la contrebasse à quatre et cinq cordes, the Vingt études de virtuosité, and his Dix étude-caprices). 

Although his two concertos (his own and the musical hoax under Dragonetti's name) are important repertory items, Nanny's most lasting contribution was in the field of pedagogy (instructional method). Edouard Nanny taught at the Paris Conservatory until 1940.  In his principle work, Enseignement Complet considered his most lasting accomplishment, Nanny passed to others the method he used to become a virtuoso during his lifetime. This is his from-basic-to-virtuoso, ‘A-to-Z’ repertoire of studies for the double bassist, originally for bowing but also for pizzicato (plucked).  Quite naturally it can be applied to the bass guitar and cello - same clef and similar range as the double bass.  For the cello, although the notes are read identically they will however, sound an octave higher. This does not detract from this method  advancing the artistry  of cellists as well as bassists.

The initial exercises are simple, using scale phrases introduced slowly in simple keys: C Maj., G Maj., then D Maj. and so on.  The studies progress to simple jumps together with partial scale phrases then to complex jumps and intricate rhythms in progressively more difficult keys and at faster tempos.  From the easy beginning to the difficult finale of this book; a beginner or intermediate bassist can finish in two to five years of study.  A more advanced player - one to two or perhaps three years to complete. The scope of this method is vast, graduated, intricate and all-encompassing.  Once finished, this book alone can bring a student to an expertise, a mastery of any of the stringed basses; elementary to virtuosity in fifty-two pages perhaps in as little as three to five years.

Nanny's Concerto in A major that was attributed to classical Italian virtuoso Domenico Dragonetti was, in fact, penned by Nanny.

Nanny's study method, "Enseignement Complet'' his études and caprices have been studied and played for close to a century by double bassists, performers, teachers and students alike.

References

External links

 Profile and photo 

French classical double-bassists
Male double-bassists
1872 births
1942 deaths
People from Saint-Germain-en-Laye